Coffee Beanery is a Flushing, Michigan based chain of coffee shops operating in the United States, Asia, and U.S. Territories. It was founded in Dearborn, Michigan in 1976 by JoAnne and Julius Shaw in the United States.

History
In 1976, JoAnne and Julius Shaw began selling specialty coffee to consumers in their first store at Fairlane Town Center in Dearborn, Michigan. As of February 2007, the company had 131 franchise locations in the United States and another 25 in other countries.

Business model
The company makes most of its money selling franchises and equipment, not the product itself. Most shops close within three years; since the company's founding, more than 100 franchises have failed.

Legal determinations
In 2006, the Maryland securities commissioner determined that the company had made "material misrepresentations" to prospective franchisees in violation of state law, and ordered it to release Maryland franchisees from their contracts without penalty. In 2008, the Illinois attorney general made a similar determination. The Maryland order also directed the company to "permanently cease and desist from offering and selling" franchises in Maryland.
In the judge's court order, he ruled “This case is buyers’ remorse” and the case was settled in 2013.

See also

 List of coffeehouse chains

References

External links
 

Coffeehouses and cafés in the United States
Restaurants established in 1976
Companies based in Genesee County, Michigan
1976 establishments in Michigan
Flushing, Michigan